The Institute for the Study of Knowledge Management in Education (ISKME), is a 501(c)(3) non-profit organization founded in 2002. Located in Half Moon Bay, California, its mission is to make learning and knowledge sharing participatory, equitable, and open.

Areas of study 
ISKME’s work is divided into divided into five main areas, which include open education research, field-building and leadership development, platform and tools, library and information sciences, and an innovation and design lab.

History 

ISKME was established in 2002 by Lisa Petrides, formerly a professor in Teachers College at Columbia University. ISKME’s initial research focused on the capacity of college faculty and administrators to use educational data to inform decision-making as well as knowledge management in the philanthropic sector. In 2002, ISKME conducted a study for grantmakers in education on the sharing of data and information among foundations. In 2003, ISKME published a monograph on knowledge management in education. In 2004, with support from the William and Flora Hewlett Foundation, ISKME expanded to include research and training in the development of open educational resources, conducted in partnership with organizations including the Monterey Institute of Technology, Connexions, Teachers Domain, Free High School Science Texts, Siyavula in South Africa and Training Commons in India.
In 2005, ISKME engaged in research partnerships with schools of education and training programs for school principals, including work with the San Francisco School Alliance and the University of California’s Principal Leadership Institute. In 2007, ISKME launched OER Commons, a digital repository of open teaching and learning resources. That same year, Petrides was one of 27 open education leaders invited to an international gathering in Cape Town, South Africa, which produced the 2007 Cape Town Open Education Declaration. This declaration laid the groundwork for other international open educational resources policy agreements, including the Recommendation on Open Educational Resources adopted, with the support of ISKME, by UNESCO’s General Conference at its 40th session in 2019. In 2009, ISKME hosted its inaugural Big Ideas Fest, held in Half Moon Bay, California. In 2014, OER Commons was rebranded as a curated, public digital library, and ISKME developed one of its first microsites when it began managing the National Science Digital Library.  ISKME also developed hubs, customizable, branded resource centers on OER Commons.  ISKME currently supports states, nations, and other entities through a range of open education services.

ISKME’s partnerships include supporting Secretary of State Hillary Clinton and Undersecretary of Education Martha Kanter in launching the 2013 Open Book Project in the Middle East. ISKME also established OER partnerships in K-12 and higher education with OpenStax, NAACP, the Arab League Educational, Cultural and Scientific Organization (ALECSO), UNESCO on their ICT Competency Framework for Teachers, and the American Association of Colleges and Universities (AAC&U).  In 2018, ISKME was selected to partner with the U.S. Department of Education’s Office of Educational Technology (OET) on its #GoOpen initiative. OET has since sunsetted its federal leadership of the #GoOpen initiative and passed the baton to ISKME to foster ongoing national engagement in K-12 open education.

San Francisco public television station KQED and Roadtrip Nation have been co-sponsors of the Big Ideas Fest.

Awards 
ISKME was named an Education Laureate by the San Jose Tech Museum of Innovation in 2007 for OER Commons. In December 2010, ISKME was named a finalist in the Qatar Foundation World Innovation Summit for Education (WISE) Awards for its OER Commons teacher professional development programs. 

In 2011, ISKME won the Award for Bodies which Influence Policy from the Open Educational Quality Initiative (OPAL), a consortium that includes UNESCO, the International Council for Open and Distance Education, the European Foundation for Quality in e-Learning, and several European universities.
In 2011 ISKME announced a matching grant from the Bill and Melinda Gates Foundation to support the Big Ideas in Beta program, focused on incubating innovation in education.

In 2017, the American Association of School Librarians recognized ISKME’s OER Commons as one of the nation’s best websites for teaching and learning.

See also 
 Open educational practices

References

External links 
 ISKME, in California, United States
 Helping Educators Determine the Quality of Open Education Resources

Educational organizations based in the United States
Education in San Mateo County, California
Half Moon Bay, California
Organizations based in California